Body Bags is a 1993 American horror comedy anthology television film featuring three unconnected stories, with bookend segments featuring John Carpenter, Tom Arnold and Tobe Hooper as deranged morgue attendees. It was directed by Carpenter and Hooper, with Larry Sulkis handling the bookend segments. It first aired on August 8, 1993. It is notable for its numerous celebrity cameo appearances.

The first story, "The Gas Station", features Robert Carradine as a gas station attendant with cameos by David Naughton, Sam Raimi, and Wes Craven. "Hair" follows Stacy Keach as he receives a botched hair transplant that infests him with an alien parasite. "Eye" features Mark Hamill as a baseball player who loses an eye in a car accident and receives a transplant, only to be taken over by the personality of the eye's previous owner, a murderous killer.

Plot

Prologue 
A creepy-looking coroner introduces three different horror tales involving his current work on various gruesome cadavers in "body bags."

"The Gas Station"
Directed by John Carpenter.  Anne is a young college student who arrives for her first shift working at an all-night filling station near Haddonfield, Illinois (a reference to the setting of Carpenter's Halloween). The worker going off shift, Bill, reminds her that a serial killer has broken out of a mental hospital and cautions her not to leave the booth at the station without the keys because the door locks automatically. After Bill leaves, Anne is alone and the tension mounts as she deals with various late-night customers, unsure whether any of them might be the escaped maniac. When a customer ("Pete") forgets his credit card, Anne runs after him and accidentally locks herself out of the booth. Before she can get the spare key from a nearby garage, a homeless transient (George Buck Flower) approaches her and asks to use the restroom. Anne returns to the booth and gives the transient the restroom key. Anne later goes inside the men's restroom to check on the transient, only to find an elaborately grotesque drawing on an evil looking entity carrying beheaded people. She panics and runs out, only to find the dead body of the transient sitting in a pickup truck on a lift in one of the garage bays. She then tries to make a phone call for help, which results in her realization that "Bill," the attending worker she met earlier, is in fact the escaped murderer, who has killed the real Bill and taken his place. The fake "Bill" attempts to kill Anne with a machete, breaking into the locked booth by smashing out the glass with a sledgehammer, then chasing her around the deserted filling station and garage. Just as he is about to kill her, Pete suddenly returns in search of his credit card. He wrestles the killer, giving Anne time to crush the maniac under the vehicle lift.

"Hair"
Directed by John Carpenter. Richard Coberts is a middle-aged businessman who is very self-conscious about his thinning hair. This obsession has caused a rift between him and his long-suffering girlfriend Megan. Richard answers a television ad about a "miracle" hair transplant procedure, pays a visit to the office, and meets the shady Dr. Lock, who agrees to give Richard a solution to make his hair grow back. The next day, Richard wakes up and removes the bandage around his head, and is overjoyed to find that he has a full head of hair. But soon he becomes increasingly sick and fatigued, and finds his hair continuing to grow and, additionally, growing out of parts of his body, where hair does not normally grow. Trying to cut a hair off his mouth, he finds that it "screams", and, examining it under a magnifying glass, sees that it's alive and resembles a tiny serpent. He goes back to Dr. Lock for an explanation, but finds himself a prisoner as Dr. Lock explains that he and his entire staff are aliens from another planet, seeking out narcissistic human beings and planting seeds of "hair" to take over their bodies for consumption as part of their plan to spread their essence to Earth. Richard is last seen calmly sitting, near death, with his long hair being brushed by a nurse. The coroner reveals that, later, Richard jumped off of the building, only to be hit by a moving car and then dragged underneath a moving train.

"Eye"
Directed by Tobe Hooper. Brent Matthews is an aging Minor League Baseball player whose life and career take a turn for the worse when he gets into a serious car accident in which his right eye is gouged out. Unwilling to admit that his career is over, he jumps at the chance to undergo an experimental surgical procedure to replace his eye with one from a recently deceased person. But soon after the surgery he begins hallucinate things out of his new eye, and begins having nightmares of killing women and having sex with them. Brent seeks out the doctor who operated on him, and the doctor tells him that the donor of his new eye was John Randle, a recently executed serial killer and necrophile. Brent becomes convinced that the spirit of the dead killer is taking over his body so that he can resume killing women. He flees back to his house and tells his skeptical wife, Cathy, about what is happening. Just then, the spirit of the killer emerges and attempts to kill Cathy as well. Cathy fights back, subduing him long enough for Brent to re-emerge. Realizing that it is only a matter of time before the killer takes control again, Brent stabs his donated eye with garden scissors - severing his link with the killer - causing him to bleed to death.

Epilogue 
The coroner is finishing telling his last tale when he hears a noise from outside the morgue. He crawls back inside a body bag, revealing that he himself is a living cadaver. The noise is shown to be the return of two other morgue workers, who begin to autopsy the "John Doe" corpse of the narrator.

Cast

"The Morgue" (Prologue)
John Carpenter as The Coroner (and cadaver)
Tom Arnold as Morgue Worker #1
Tobe Hooper as Morgue Worker #2

"The Gas Station"
Robert Carradine as Bill
Alex Datcher as Anne
Wes Craven as Pasty-Faced Man
Sam Raimi as Dead Bill
David Naughton as Pete
Lucy Boryer as Peggy
George Buck Flower as Stranger
Peter Jason as Gent
Molly Cheek as Divorcee

 "Hair"
Stacy Keach as Richard Coberts
David Warner as Dr. Lock
Sheena Easton as Megan
Dan Blom as Dennis
Gregory Nicotero as Man with dog
Kim Alexis as Woman with Beautiful Hair
 Attila as Man with Beautiful Hair
Deborah Harry as The Nurse

"Eye"
Mark Hamill as Brent Matthews
Twiggy as Cathy Matthews
John Agar as Dr. Lang
Roger Corman as Dr. Bregman
Charles Napier as Baseball Team Manager
Eddie Velez as Baseball Player

Background
Showtime Networks planned to create Body Bags as a television series similar to HBO's Tales from the Crypt. However, shortly after filming began, Showtime decided not to pursue the series. The three completed stories were assembled around John Carpenter's narration segment, and Body Bags became a horror anthology.

Home media
The film was released on Blu-ray in Shout Factory!'s Scream Factory series in late fall 2013.

Soundtrack

The soundtrack is by John Carpenter (composition, performance, production) and Jim Lang (composition, performance, synthesizer programming, recording, mixing, production), with Robert Townson being the executive producer. It was released in 1993 through Varèse Sarabande.

Track listing

Critical reception
Body Bags was generally well received by critics and holds a 67% approval rating on movie review aggregator website Rotten Tomatoes, based on 12 reviews with an average score of 5.56/10.

However, Time Out called the film "an attempt by a pair of one-time horror auteurs to emulate the successful Tales from the Crypt formula, only now it's nowhere near as happening."

Reviewing the film in Variety, Tony Scott stated that "None of the three playlets breaks barriers, and the writing's perfunctory, but the productions are good, the casting interesting".

See also
 Nightmares - a 1983 anthology film with television roots.
 List of horror anthology films

References

External links

Body Bags at Rotten Tomatoes

1993 horror films
American horror anthology films
American comedy horror films
American science fiction horror films
Films about extraterrestrial life
1990s serial killer films
American slasher films
1993 television films
1990s comedy horror films
1990s slasher films
Slasher comedy films
1993 films
Films directed by John Carpenter
Films directed by Tobe Hooper
Films scored by John Carpenter
American horror television films
1993 comedy films
Films set in Illinois
1990s English-language films
American drama television films
1990s American films